This is a list of members of the Tasmanian Legislative Council between 1891 and 1897. Terms of the Legislative Council did not coincide with Legislative Assembly elections, and members served six year terms, with a number of members facing election each year.

Elections

Members

Notes
  On 11 June 1892, George Salier, one of the three members for Hobart, died. Charles Henry Grant won the resulting by-election on 24 June 1892.
  On 17 August 1892, the new Premier of Tasmania, Henry Dobson, appointed Sir Adye Douglas to the Ministry as Chief Secretary. As such he was required to resign and contest a ministerial by-election, and was returned unopposed on 26 August.
  On 14 April 1894, the new Premier of Tasmania, Sir Philip Fysh, appointed William Moore to the Ministry as Chief Secretary. He resigned to contest a ministerial by-election, and was returned unopposed on 27 April.
  On 14 April 1894, Sir Philip Fysh, the member for Buckingham, became Premier of Tasmania. Rather than contest his own seat at the ministerial by-election, Fysh transferred to the Legislative Assembly seat of North Hobart, which he won on 24 April, whilst Frederick Piesse, the former member for North Hobart, won the Buckingham seat in the Council by just four votes on 8 May 1894 against Dr Gamaliel Butler.
  In April 1896, Alexander McGregor, one of the three members for Hobart, retired. Dr Gamaliel Butler won the resulting by-election on 6 May 1896.

Sources
 
 Parliament of Tasmania (2006). The Parliament of Tasmania from 1856

Members of Tasmanian parliaments by term
19th-century Australian politicians